Kallithea (Greek: Καλλιθέα) may refer to:

Places in Greece 
municipalities:
Kallithea, a city in Attica, suburb of Athens
Kallithea, Rhodes, a municipality on Rhodes
Kallithea, Thessaloniki, a municipality in the Thessaloniki metropolitan area
parts of other municipalities:
Kallithea, Achaea, a village in northcentral Achaea, part of Messatida
Kallithea, Aetolia-Acarnania, a village in eastern Aetolia-Acarnania, part of Paravola
Kallithea, Boeotia, a village in southeastern Boeotia, part of Tanagra
Kallithea, Chalkidiki, a village in southwestern Chalkidiki, part of Kassandra
Kallithea, Corinthia, a village in western Corinthia, part of Evrostini
Kallithea, Drama, a village in Drama, part of Prosotsani
Kallithea, Elis, a village in Elis, part of Alifeira
Kallithea, Euboea, a village in central Euboea, part of Amarynthos
Kallithea, Florina, a village in northwestern Florina, part of Prespes
Kallithea, Grevena, in Grevena, part of Gorgiani
Kallithea, Heraklion, a village on Crete (Heraklion regional unit), part of Nea Alikarnassos
Kallithea, Ioannina, a village in northern Ioannina, part of Konitsa
Kallithea, Laconia, a village in eastern Laconia, part of Geronthres
in Larissa regional unit:
Kallithea, Narthaki, in southern Larissa, part of Narthaki
Kallithea Elassonos, in northern Larissa, part of Olympos
Kallithea, Lemnos, a village on Lemnos
Kallithea, Messenia, a village in Messenia, part of Pylos
Kallithea, Phocis, a village in southern Phocis, part of Tolofona
Kallithea, Phthiotis, a village in Phthiotis, part of Spercheiada
Kallithea, Pieria, a village in eastern Pieria, part of Paralia
Kallithea, Samos, a village on Samos, part of Marathokampos
in Thesprotia:
Kallithea, Paramythia, a village in eastern Thesprotia, part of Paramythia
Kallithea, Filiates, a village in northern Thesprotia, part of Filiates
Kallithea, Trikala, in Trikala, part of Tymfaia
in Xanthi regional unit:
Kallithea, Xanthi, part of Xanthi
Kallithea, Stavroupoli, part of Stavroupoli
Kallithea, Zakynthos, a village in Zakynthos, part of Alykes

Science and technology 
 Kallithea (software), source code management system.
 Niki Kallithea, a Bulgarian autogyro design